Roe or hard roe is the fully ripe internal egg masses in the ovaries, or the released external egg masses, of fish and certain marine animals such as shrimp, scallop, sea urchins and squid. As a seafood, roe is used both as a cooked ingredient in many dishes, and as a raw ingredient for delicacies such as caviar.

The roe of marine animals, such as the roe of lumpsucker, hake, mullet, salmon, Atlantic bonito, mackerel, squid, and cuttlefish are especially rich sources of omega-3 fatty acids, but omega-3s are present in all fish roe. Also, a significant amount of vitamin B12 is among the nutrients present in fish roes.

Roe from a sturgeon or sometimes other fish such as flathead grey mullet, is the raw base product from which caviar is made.

The term soft roe or white roe denotes fish milt, not fish eggs.

Around the world

Africa

South Africa
People in KwaZulu-Natal consume fish roe in the form of slightly sour curry or battered and deep fried.

Americas

Brazil 
In southern Brazil, in particular in the litoral parts of the state of Santa Catarina (from Azorean colonization), mullet roesacks are consumed deep-fried or pan-seared by the locals.

Canada
In the province of New Brunswick, roe (caviare) of the Atlantic sturgeon is harvested from the Saint John river.

Roe from the cisco  is harvested from the Great Lakes, primarily for overseas markets.

Roe is also extracted from herring, salmon, and sea urchins.

In coastal British Columbia, Fraser River white sturgeon are sustainably farmed to produce caviar.

Chile
In Chile, sea urchin roe is a traditional food known as an "erizo de mar". Chile is one of many countries that exports sea urchins to Japan in order to fulfill Japanese demand.

Dominican Republic 
In Dominican Republic, dried and smoked herring roe ("huevas de arenque") is eaten. Unlike in some countries, it's generally cooked before consumption.

Peru
In Peru, roe is served in many seafood restaurants sauteed, breaded and pan fried, and sometimes accompanied by a side of fresh onion salad. It is called Huevera Frita. Cojinova (Seriolella violacea) yields the best roe for this dish. Despite the fact that many people like it, it is hardly considered a delicacy. Upscale restaurants are not expected to offer it, but street vendors and smaller restaurants will make their first daily sales of it before they run out. Cojinova itself (considered a medium quality fish) is  caught for its fish meal, not for its roe, which is considered a chance product. Sea urchin roe is considered a delicacy and it is used (at customer request) to add strength to ceviche.

United States

In the United States, several kinds of roe are produced: salmon from the Pacific coast, shad and herring species such as the American shad and alewife, mullet, paddlefish, American bowfin, and some species of sturgeon. Shad, pike, and other roe sometimes are pan-fried with bacon. Spot prawn roe (hard to find) is also a delicacy from the North Pacific. Flounder roe, pan-fried and served with grits is popular on the Southeastern coast.

Asia

Cambodia
In Cambodia roe are fermented and usually eaten with steamed eggs, omelettes and other hen or duck egg dishes.

China
In many regions in China, crab and urchin roes are eaten as a delicacy. Crab roe are often used as topping in dishes such as "crab roe tofu" (蟹粉豆腐). Nanxiang Steamed Bun Restaurant serves "crab roe xiaolongbao" as their special. Shrimp roes are also eaten in certain places, especially around the downstream of Yangtze River, such as Wuhu, as toppings for noodle soup.

India, Pakistan and Bangladesh 

Among the populace of eastern India, roe that has been deeply roasted over an open fire is a delicacy. In this region, the roe of rohu is also considered a delicacy and is eaten fried or as a stuffing within a fried pointed gourd to make .

Roe from the ilish fish is considered a delicacy in Bangladesh. The roe is usually deep-fried, although other preparations such as mashed roe where the roe crushed along with oil, onion and pepper, or curry of roe can also be found.

All along the Konkan coast and Northern Kerala, the roe of sardines, black mackerel and several other fish is considered a delicacy. The roe can be eaten fried (after being coated with red chilli paste) and also as a thick curry (gashi). In Goa and Malvan, roe is first steamed or poached, then coated with salt and chilli powder and then shallow fried or roasted on a tawa (flat pan). In the state of Kerala, roe is deep fried in coconut oil, and is considered a delicacy. A common method of quick preparation is to wrap the roe in wet banana leaves and cook it over charcoal embers.

In Odisha and West Bengal, roe of several fresh-water fish, including hilsa, are eaten, the roe being cooked separately or along with the fish, the latter method being preferred for all but large fishes. Roe, either light or deep-fried are also eaten as snacks or appetizers before a major meal.

All along the Indus River and Specially South Pakistan Sindh, the roe of Palla (fish), and several other fish is considered a delicacy. The roe can be eaten fried (after being coated with red chilli paste) and also as a thick curry (Salan/Curry). coated with salt and chilli powder and then shallow fried or roasted on a tawa (flat pan).

Indonesia
Pepes telur ikan is a dish of steamed or fried spiced roe wrapped in banana leaf. In Makassar, It is made from flying fish roe or locals called ikan tuing-tuing. Also in Gresik, the pepes is made from Java barb roe or locals called ikan bader.

In Kendal, telur ikan mimi has become a Ramadan dish. It is made from horseshoe crab roe with grated coconut.

Iran
In the Caspian provinces of Gilan and Mazandaran, several types of roe are used. Called ashpal or ashbal, roe is consumed grilled, cured, salted, or mixed with other ingredients. If salted or cured, it is consumed as a condiment. If used fresh, it is usually grilled, steamed, or mixed with eggs and fried to form a custard-like dish called "Ashpal Kuku".

Besides the much sought-after caviar, roe from kutum (also known as Caspian white fish or Rutilus frisii kutum), Caspian roach (called "kuli" in Gileki), bream (called "kulmeh" in Gileki), and Caspian salmon are highly prized. Roe from carp is less common and barbel roe is also occasionally used.

Israel

Several sections of the Israeli cuisine include roe. In Modern Hebrew, roe is commonly referred to by its Russian name "ikra" (איקרה). When necessary, the color is also mentioned: white or pink, as appropriate. Israeli "white ikra" is commonly made of carp or herring eggs, while "red ikra" is made of flathead mullet eggs or, in rarer cases, salmon eggs. The term "caviar" is separate, and denotes only sturgeon eggs.

Ikra is served as a starter dish, to be eaten with pita or similar breads, particularly in Arab restaurants. It can also be purchased in stores, in standard-sized plastic packages. In home cooking it is similarly served as a starter dish.

In Judaism, roe from kosher fish—fish with fins and scales—is considered kosher. Like fish in general, it is considered pareve. Roe is considered kosher only if the fish from which it is harvested is kosher as well. This means that sturgeon roe is not considered kosher from an Orthodox Jewish perspective.

For most Orthodox Jewish consumers who keep kosher, roe or caviar must be processed under kosher supervision as well. The only exception to this rule is red roe,  thanks to a widely accepted responsa by the Bais Yosef.

Japan

A variety of roe types are used in Japanese cuisine, including the following which are used raw in sushi:

 Ikura - Salmon roe. Large reddish-orange individual spheres. It is a loan word from the Russian, "икра" (roe, in this context caviar)
 Sujiko - Also salmon roe. The difference is that sujiko is still inside its sac when it is prepared. It also has a different color; sujiko is red to dark-red while ikura is lighter in color, sometimes almost orange. Sujiko is also sweeter in taste.
 Masago- Capelin roe, similar to Tobiko, but smaller.
 Kazunoko - Herring roe, yellow or pinkish, having a firm, rubbery texture and appearance, usually pickled.  The roe is in a single cohesive mass and so looks like a piece of fish.
 Mentaiko - Alaska pollock roe, spiced with powdered red pepper and surrounded by a thin, elastic membrane. Mentaiko is usually pink to dark red.
 Tarako - Salted Alaska pollock roe, sometimes grilled.
 Tobiko - Flying fish roe, very crunchy, reddish orange in color.

 Uni - Sea urchin roe, soft and melting. Color ranges from orange to pale yellow. Humans consume the reproductive organs ("roe") either raw or briefly cooked. Sea urchin roe is a popular food in Japan, and it is called "uni" in Japanese sushi cuisine. Apart from domestic consumption, a number of other countries export the sea urchin to Japan in order to meet its demand throughout the country. Traditionally considered an aphrodisiac, sea urchin roe has been found to contain the cannabinoid anandamide.
Karasumi - is a specialty of Nagasaki and along with salt-pickled sea urchin roe and Konowata one of the three chinmi of Japan. It is made by desalinating salt-pickled mullet roe while still in the ovary and sun drying it.
 Ebiko - Shrimp roe, sometimes translated as "Shrimp Flakes"; the eggs are smaller and generally a darker orange than Tobiko. There is a variant of Ebiko made from Capelin roe.

Korea
All kinds of fish roe are widely eaten in Korean cuisine, including the popular sea urchin, salmon, herring, flying fish, cod, among others. Myeongran  (명란젓) refers to the jeotgal (salted fermented seafood) made with pollock roe seasoned with chili pepper powders.

Albap is a bibimbap made with roe.

Lebanon
Sea urchin roe, or  توتية as it is known locally, is eaten directly from the sea urchin shell fresh using a small spoon. Some people add a twist of lemon juice to the roe and eat it in Lebanese flat bread.

Malaysia
Particularly in Sarawak, Malaysia, Toli Shad fish roe is a popular delicacy among locals and tourists. The roe is usually found in the street market in Sarawak's capital city of Kuching. The roe can be sold for up to US$19 per 100 grams and is considered expensive among locals, but the price can reach up to US$30 in other states of Malaysia.

The roe is usually salted before sale but fresh roe is also available. The salted roe is usually pan fried or steamed and eaten with steamed rice. The fish itself is also usually salted and served along with the roe.

Oceania

New Zealand
The Maori people and other New Zealanders eat sea urchin roe, called "kina". Kina is sold in fish shops, supermarkets, and alongside the road. Most commercial kina is imported from the Chatham Islands.

Europe
All around the Mediterranean, botargo is an esteemed specialty made of the cured roe pouch of flathead mullet, tuna, or swordfish; it is called bottarga (Italian), poutargue or boutargue (French), botarga (Spanish), batarekh (Arabic) or avgotaraho (Greek αυγοτάραχο).

Denmark
The most commonly eaten roe in Denmark is cod roe, usually sold canned with added water, starch, oil, salt, and tomato puree and then boiled and preserved. It is served sliced, either as is or slightly roasted in a pan, on top of rye bread, sometimes topped with remoulade and/or lemon. An everyday food item on many Danish lunch tables.
Lumpfish (stenbider) roe is another roe used in Danish cuisine. It is considered somewhat of a luxury item and is primarily used as a condiment on top of halved or sliced hard-boiled eggs, on top of mounds of shrimp, or in combination with other fish or seafood.

France
Sea urchin roe (oursin in French) is eaten directly from the sea and in restaurants, where it is served both by itself and in seafood platters, usually spooned from the shell of the animal. Crab, shrimp and prawn roe still attached to those animals is also considered a delicacy.

Finland
Common whitefish and especially vendace from the fresh water lakes in Finland are renowned for the excellent delicate taste of the roe. Roe is served as topping of toast or on blini with onion and smetana.

Greece

Taramá is salted and cured carp or cod roe used to make taramosaláta, a Greek meze consisting of taramá mixed with lemon juice, bread crumbs, onions, and olive oil; it is eaten as a dip.

Avgotaraho (αυγοτάραχο) or botargo is the prepared roe of the flathead mullet.

Italy
Bottarga is primarily the salted and dried roe pouch of the Atlantic bluefin tuna; it can also be prepared with the dried roe pouch of the flathead mullet, even if it is considered of low quality and less tasty. It is used minced for dressing pasta or sliced with olive oil and lemon (Fishermen style). The coastal town of Alghero, Sardinia, is also known for its "bogamarì" specialty (fresh sea urchin roe).

Norway
Norwegian caviar is most commonly made from cod, but caviar made from lumpsucker or capelin roe is also available. 
During winter season, when skrei, winter cod is available, roe is cooked in its sack and served with cod liver and poached cod.  This traditional dish is particularly popular in coastal Norway and is called mølje.
In some areas it is also common to fry the roe from freshly caught fish, to be eaten on bread or with potatoes and flatbread.

Portugal
Codfish roe and sardine roe are sold in olive oil. The fresh roe of hake (pescada) is also consumed (a popular way of eating it is boiled with vegetables, and simply seasoned with olive oil and a dash of vinegar). In the South of Portugal, the "ouriço do mar" (sea urchin) is highly appreciated. In the Sines area (Alentejo), a layer of dried pine needles is placed on the ground and, on top of it, a layer of sea urchins. This layer is topped with a second layer of dried pine needles. The pile is set on fire. The roe is removed from the cooked sea urchins and eaten. Sea urchin is not consumed in May, June, July, and August.

Romania

Fish roe is very popular in Romania as a starter (like salată de icre) or sometimes served for breakfast on toasted bread. The most common roe is that of the European carp; pike, herring, cod are also popular. Fried soft roe is also a popular dish. Sturgeon roe is a delicacy normally served at functions.

Russia and ex-USSR countries 

In Russian, all types of fish roe are called ikra (икра), and there is no linguistic distinction between the English words "roe" and "caviar." Sturgeon roe, called chyornaya ikra (чёрная икра, "black caviar") is most prized. It is followed in prestige by salmon roe called krasnaya ikra (красная икра, "red caviar"), which is less expensive, but still considered a delicacy. Both types of roe are usually served lightly salted on buttered wheat bread, or as an accompaniment for blini, or used as an ingredient in various haute cuisine and festive dishes. More common roes, such as cod, Alaska pollock, and herring are everyday dishes. Salted cod or pollock roe on buttered bread is common breakfast fare and herring roe is often eaten smoked or fried. The roe of freshwater fish is also popular but the commercial availability is lower. Soft roe of various fishes is also widely consumed, mostly fried, and is a popular cantina-style dish.

Roe found in dried vobla fish is considered delicious by some; though dried vobla roe is not produced separately as a stand-alone dish, roe-carrying vobla is prized.

Spain
Cod and hake roe is commonly consumed throughout Spain in many different forms: sautéed, grilled, fried, marinated, pickled, boiled, with mayonnaise, or in salad. Tuna and ling dry brined roe is traditional in Andalusia and the Mediterranean coasts since antiquity. In all of the Spanish coastal regions, sea urchin roe is considered a delicacy and consumed raw. Roe from the Mediterranean grey mullet, Mugil cephalus, is a sustainable roe resembling sturgeon roe that is marketed from Spain to countries around the world.

Sweden

Smoked and salted cod roe paste known as smörgåskaviar is commonly served as sandwich topping in Sweden.

Lightly salted roe of the vendace is called Löjrom in Swedish. It is naturally orange in colour. The most sought after type is Kalix Löjrom from Kalix in the northern Baltic sea.

Most Löjrom consumed in Sweden is however imported frozen from North America.

Stenbitsrom, the roe of lumpfish is naturally a bleak unappetizing gray, but is coloured black (to emulate black caviar) or orange (to emulate Löjrom). Stenbitsrom sells in much larger volume than Löjrom, but it has two drawbacks: it tastes of little more than its salt and artificial additives, and the colour additives tend to bleed into other parts of the food served with it (such as a boiled egg), or to discolour porcelain dishes.

There is also a trend to use more Laxrom (salmon roe), which is a natural orange colour, with a large diameter.

United Kingdom
Though not popular, herring roe is sold within many British supermarkets. Battered cod roe can also be bought from many fish and chip shops. Various tinned roes are on sale in supermarkets e.g. soft cod roes, pressed cod roes and herring roes.

See also

 Egg as food
 Fish reproduction
 Smoked egg

References

 
Fish products